Carreghofa is a community in Montgomeryshire, Powys, Wales, and is 89.6 miles (144.2 km) from Cardiff and 153.6 miles (247.2 km) from London. In 2011 the population of Carreghofa was 667 with 10.2% of them able to speak Welsh.
78% of people had no form of Welsh identity.

The largest settlement in the community is the Welsh part of the village of Llanymynech (the western part) on the border with England.

References

See also
List of localities in Wales by population

Communities in Powys